John Keells IT, also known as JKIT formerly John Keells Computer Services is a software company that is developing software primarily for the aviation and leisure industries. It is headquartered in Colombo, Sri Lanka. It also operates Offshore Development Centers (ODCs) in Dubai and Scandinavia.

JKCS is a subsidiary of John Keells Holdings (JKH), which is one of the largest business conglomerates in Sri Lanka. JKCS is one of the three IT related companies operated under John Keells Holdings. These are John Keells Computer Services (JKCS),John Keells Office Automation (JKOA) Limited and John Keells Business Process Outsourcing Ltd (JKBPO).

Some of its major clients include Emirates Airline, SriLankan Airlines, Air Arabia, Qatar Airways, Computer Sciences Corporation (CSC), Keells Hotel Management Systems Ltd (KHMS). The Emirates Skywards passenger rewards system was also developed by JKCS and is also used by many airlines including SriLankan Airlines which also came under Emirates Airline administration after its acquisition of the controlling stake.

Products 

JKCS currently provides software engineering services related to airline solutions including booking/reservations, airport management, and hospitality services, besides a quality informations system.

References 

Software companies of Sri Lanka
John Keells Holdings